NGC 176 is an open cluster around 3.5 million light-years away in the constellation Tucana. It is located within the Small Magellanic Cloud. It was discovered on August 12, 1834 by John Herschel.

See also 
 Open cluster 
 List of NGC objects (1–1000)
 Tucana

References

External links 
 
 
 SEDS

0176
Open clusters
Astronomical objects discovered in 1834
Discoveries by John Herschel
Tucana (constellation)
Small Magellanic Cloud